Norman Edward Fawcett (July 29, 1910 – January 26, 1997) was a Canadian politician, who represented the riding of Nickel Belt in the House of Commons of Canada from 1965 to 1968. He was a member of the New Democratic Party of Canada.

He was born in Adanac, Saskatchewan. He later settled in Capreol, Ontario, where he worked as a railway conductor and a union activist before entering municipal politics, serving as a municipal councillor and deputy mayor beginning in 1962.

Fawcett won a 1965 by-election brought on by the resignation of Osias Godin. He represented Nickel Belt for three years, and was defeated by Liberal candidate Gaetan Serré in the 1968 election. Following his defeat, he was re-elected to Capreol's town council as mayor in 1969, serving four years. After two years out of office, he was re-elected to town council in 1975, serving as councillor and deputy mayor until his retirement from politics in 1991.

Following his death in 1997, statements of tribute were delivered in the House of Commons of Canada by Raymond Bonin, John Williams, Elsie Wayne, Bill Blaikie and René Laurin.

Fawcett's daughter Gaye is married to Elie Martel, who was the Member of Provincial Parliament for Sudbury East from 1967 to 1987. Shelley Martel, Elie Martel's daughter and Fawcett's granddaughter, won election to the Legislative Assembly of Ontario upon Elie Martel's retirement, and continued to represent the riding of Nickel Belt until her own retirement from politics in 2007. She was married to former Ontario New Democratic Party leader Howard Hampton.

References

External links
 

1910 births
1997 deaths
Members of the House of Commons of Canada from Ontario
New Democratic Party MPs
Mayors of places in Ontario
Politicians from Greater Sudbury
Trade unionists from Ontario